The 2003 East Northamptonshire District Council election took place on 1 May 2003 to elect members of East Northamptonshire District Council in Northamptonshire, England. This was the first election to be held under new ward boundaries. The Conservative Party retained overall control of the council.

References

2003 English local elections
2003
2000s in Northamptonshire